Greenlay is a surname. Notable people with the surname include:

Charles Greenlay (1899–1984), Canadian politician
Mike Greenlay (born 1968), Canadian ice hockey player